Yeakle Mill is an unincorporated community in Warren Township in Franklin County, Pennsylvania, United States. Yeakle Mill is located on Mill Drive east of Pennsylvania Route 456.

References

Unincorporated communities in Franklin County, Pennsylvania
Unincorporated communities in Pennsylvania